Nadia Hashem (died 12 February 2023) was a Jordanian journalist and politician who served as minister of state for women's affairs from May 2012 to October 2012. She was the first woman state minister for women's affairs of Jordan.

Education
Hashem held a bachelor's degree in mathematics, which she received from Middlesex University.

Career
Hashem worked as a journalist for Al Ra'i. She was the president of the National Society for Enhancement of Freedom and Democracy, a society supporting democratic participation.

Hashem was appointed minister of state for women's affairs to the second cabinet of Fayez Tarawneh, which was formed on 2 May 2012. The office held by Hashem was established with her appointment. Hashem was not appointed to the next cabinet formed by Abdullah Ensour on 11 October 2012. The office was abolished, too. Then she became the head of Women Empowerment Team at Economic Development Forum.

Work
Hashem was a poet and published an Arabic novel entitled A different kind of veil in 2010.

Personal life and death
Hashem was married to engineer Abdel Afu Al Aloul and had four children. She died on 12 February 2023 and was buried the same day at the Sahab cemetery.

References

21st-century journalists
20th-century women mathematicians
21st-century Jordanian writers
21st-century Jordanian women politicians
Year of birth missing
20th-century births
2023 deaths
Alumni of Middlesex University
Jordanian women journalists
Women government ministers of Jordan
Place of birth missing
Place of death missing